The 2nd Carmen Awards were presented by the Andalusian Film Academy on 4 February 2023 at Almerías .

Background 
The ceremony enjoyed the support from Diputación Provincial de Almería, the Andalusia's Regional Ministry of Tourism, Culture and Sport, and RTVA, and the collaboration of Fundación SGAE, and Andalucía Film Commission. In November 2022, actress María Galiana was announced as the recipient of the life-achievement honorary award. The 2nd edition added new categories (up to a total of 24 categories), including the recognition of the Best Spanish Film without a share of Andalusian production.

Nominations were read on 14 December 2022 by Eva Almaya and Ignacio Mateos. Belén Cuesta and Salva Reina were later disclosed as the gala hosts. The gala featured musical performances by María Peláe, Abraham Mateo, Nuria Fergó, and The Gardener.

Prison 77 swept the awards, winning in every single category it was nominated for.

The awards trophies were made of bronze, replacing the resin trophies bestowed at the first edition.

Nominees 
The winners and nominees are listed as follows:

References 

2023 in Spain
Almería
Carmen
Spanish film awards